Cameron's Books and Magazines, or simply Cameron's, was Portland, Oregon's oldest used bookstore and one of the largest vintage magazine dealers in the United States The business opened in 1938.

Originally slated to close in November 2019, owner Crystal Zingsheim announced in April 2021 that the store was closing for good on April 24, 2021. The final day of business was April 24, 2021, as planned.

The Portland government intervened to prevent eviction of Zingsheim from the venue, which would have led to loss of the remaining unsold stock.  With assistance from the local government and several local organizations, remaining stock of books and periodicals were relocated to the upper floors of the Portland Union Station, where Zingsheim set up a non-profit organization dedicated to distribution of materials to schools and schools.  The material has also provided period style and content for historical accuracy in portraying the past.

References

External links

 

1938 establishments in Oregon
2021 disestablishments in Oregon
Bookstores of the United States
Companies based in Portland, Oregon
Retail companies disestablished in 2021
Retail companies established in 1938
Southwest Portland, Oregon